Chicken riggies or Utica riggies is an Italian-American pasta dish native to the Utica-Rome area of New York State. Although many variations exist, it is a pasta-based dish typically consisting of chicken, rigatoni, and hot or sweet peppers in a spicy cream and tomato sauce. Many of the chefs from the Utica area seem to have a claim to the dish, yet there seems to be no clear idea who was the originator.

See also

 Chicken tikka masala, a similar Indo-British dish
 List of chicken dishes
 List of pasta dishes
 Utica greens

References

Italian-American chicken dishes
Cuisine of New York (state)
Pasta dishes
Rome, New York
Utica, New York